Huyghe or Huyghé may refer to:

 Huyghe Brewery (Brouwerij Huyghe) is a brewery founded in 1906 in Belgium by Leon Huyghe in city of Melle in East Flanders.

People 
 Armand Huyghé was a Belgian World War I General
 Carlo Huyghé (1923 — 2016) was a Belgian civil servant
 Gérard-Maurice Eugène Huyghe was a 20th-century French Catholic Bishop.
 Pierre Huyghe (born 1962) is a French artist who works in a variety of media.
 René Huyghe was a French writer on the history, psychology and philosophy of art.
 Sébastien Huyghe (born 1969) is a member of the National Assembly of France.

See also
Armand Huyghé, Belgian colonel